The Zuni Indian Reservation, also known as Pueblo of Zuni, is the homeland of the Zuni tribe of Native Americans. In Zuni language, the Zuni Pueblo people are referred to as A:shiwi, and the Zuni homeland is referred to as Halona Idiwan’a meaning Middle Place.

Location

There are also several smaller non-contiguous sections in Apache County, Arizona, northwest of the city of St. Johns.

The main part of the reservation borders the state of Arizona to the west and the Ramah Navajo Reservation to the east.  The main reservation is surrounded by the Painted Cliffs, the Zuni Mountains, and the Cibola National Forest. The reservation's total land area is 723.343 sq mi (1,873.45 km²).

As noted above, the Zuni Tribe also has land holdings in Apache County, Arizona, and Catron County, New Mexico, that do not border the main reservation.

Population
The population was reported at 7,891 inhabitants in the 2010 census. Almost all of the population lives in the reservation headquarters community of Zuni Pueblo, located near the reservation's center, or in nearby Black Rock, to its east.

History and main features
Also on the main reservation are the Hawikuh Ruins. The ancient Zuni pueblo of Hawikuh was the largest of the Seven Cities of Cibola. It was established in the 13th century and abandoned in 1680. It was also the first pueblo seen by the Spanish explorers. The African scout Estevanico was the first non-Native to reach this area.

The largest town on the reservation is Zuni Pueblo, which is seat of Tribal government. Also on the reservation are the towns of Black Rock and Pescado. There is a branch campus of the University of New Mexico located in Zuni.

Tribal government

The Zuni Tribe is governed by an elected governor, lieutenant governor, and a six-member Tribal Council with elections being held every four years. The governor is the administrative head of the Tribal Council, which is the final decision-making body on the reservation. The council oversees finances, business decisions, taxes and contracts.

Education
The sections in Cibola and McKinley counties in New Mexico are zoned to the Zuni Public Schools. Zuni High School is the zoned high school.

See also
 List of Indian reservations in the United States

Bibliography
 Zuni Reservation and Off-Reservation Trust Land, New Mexico/Arizona United States Census Bureau

References

External links
 Official site of the Zuni tribe
 Official site of Zuni Tourism

American Indian reservations in Arizona
American Indian reservations in New Mexico
Geography of Apache County, Arizona
Geography of Catron County, New Mexico
Geography of Cibola County, New Mexico
Geography of McKinley County, New Mexico
Reservation